South Hero is the primary village and a census-designated place (CDP) in the town of South Hero, Grand Isle County, Vermont, United States. As of the 2020 census it had a population of 225, out of 1,674 in the entire town of South Hero.

The CDP is in southern Grand Isle County, on the Lake Champlain island of South Hero in the center of the town of the same name. It is bordered to the north by Keeler Bay, an arm of the east channel of Lake Champlain. U.S. Route 2 passes through the village, leading southeast  to Burlington and north  to Alburgh.

References 

Populated places in Grand Isle County, Vermont
Census-designated places in Grand Isle County, Vermont
Census-designated places in Vermont